The Ibanez RG7 CST was a very limited run of top quality 7-string guitars. There were only 18 of these made in 1999. Wes Borland of Limp Bizkit played one.

7CST was produced in 2 series under names RG7-PB1VV and RG7-PB2VV. RG7-PB1VV was a pilot proto run and RG7-PB2VV was made in May 1999. The only difference is the fretwire used in these guitars. The fretwires on PB1 were SBB216-195 and PB2 had SBB215-175.

The name RG7 CST derives from the US market, where there were only 2 sold. In Japan, the guitar is known as RG7-PB1VV or RG7-PB2VV. Guitar collectors and players usually know this model by the name RG7 CST.

Features
The RG7 CST features include:
 Mahogany Body
 Flame Maple top
 25.5" 3pc Maple neck with Ebony fretboard
 No Inlays
 Wizard 7 profile
 DiMarzio Custom7 pickups (h-h setup)
 L.R. Baggs Piezo pickups with a preamp
 Two output jacks. One for magnetic and one for piezo pickups
 Ibanez UV1000C Case

The guitar had a retail price of $2999.99 and there were only two sold in USA. The rest of the guitars were only sold in Japan.

Availability
This model was discontinued by Ibanez. As only 18 were made, this model is very rare. Every now and then one may appear on eBay, with prices sometimes over $6,000 for an instrument in even just medium condition.

References

RG7 CST